St. Mary's University, established in 1998, is an Ethiopian institution of higher learning located in the capital Addis Ababa.  After fifteen years of service as a college first and a university college since 2008, it earned university status from the Ethiopian Ministry of Education in September 2013.

The university has four campuses in Addis Ababa, 13 Distance Education Regional Centers, and 160 Coordination Offices throughout the country. It has 200 full-time academic staff and 1000 employees. It caters to the needs of six thousand undergraduate students, twenty thousand students enrolled in distance education programs, and two thousand students in graduate programs.

Eight graduate programs are run in partnership with Indira Gandhi National Open University. These programs include Business Administration, Public Administration, Library and Information Science, Sociology, Economics, Commerce, Rural Development and Political Science in the distance mode of learning.

In the conventional mode of learning, St. Mary's is accredited for ten graduate programs: MBA, HRM, Project Management, Accounting and Finance, Marketing management, Development Economics, Computer Science, Agribusiness, Agricultural Economics and Rural Development. The university has a testing center that provides standardized tests, job placement tests, and international tests such as the IBT- TOEFL and GRE.

St. Mary's has opened a K-12 school that is widening its reach in the realms of general education.

Research
For research, St. Mary's organises conferences and workshops, and publishes research journals, proceedings and bulletins. Among such efforts is the annual international research conference on private higher education and held since 2003.

Publishing
St. Mary's has set up a clearing house on Private Higher Education Research which is housed on its website. Other annual conferences include: The Annual Multi-disciplinary Conference, the Annual Student Research Forum, and the Annual Open and Distance Education seminar. St. Mary's publishes bi-annual journals in three disciplines; Agriculture and Development, Business and Administration, and Law. Almost all the articles published in the proceedings and journals under its auspices are made available on the website at www.smuc.edu.et. and the African Journals Online website.

Memberships
St. Mary's is a founding member of Ethiopian Private Higher Education Institutions Association, a member of the Association of African Universities, African Quality Assurance Network (AfriQan), and an associate member of the International Network for Quality Assurance Agencies in Higher Education and International Council for Distance Education.

See also
 Education in Ethiopia
 List of universities and colleges in Ethiopia

References

Ethiopia University List 2020

External links
 Official site 2020

Universities and colleges in Ethiopia
Educational institutions established in 1998
1998 establishments in Ethiopia